Daniel Edmundo Vargas Carreño (born 22 April 1937) is a Chilean politician who has served as ambassador and has worked for the Ministry of Foreign Affairs.

He is honoris causa doctor of the University of Buenos Aires.

References

External Links
 Interview as CIDH former secretary 

1937 births
Living people 
20th-century Chilean politicians
Pontifical Catholic University of Valparaíso alumni
Christian Democratic Party (Chile) politicians